Charlton County is the southernmost county of the U.S. state of Georgia, located in the southeastern part of the state. As of the 2020 census, the population was 12,518. The county seat is Folkston.

History
Georgia, by an act of the Georgia General Assembly on February 18, 1854. The original county seat was at Trader's Hill, until 1901. Additional lands from Ware County, Georgia, were added to Charlton's borders by an 1855 act of the General Assembly. In 1856, an additional legislative act redefined the Charlton–Camden borders again with each county ceding land to the other.

The county is named for Robert Milledge Charlton, a U. S. Senator from Georgia.

Geography
It is the fifth-largest county by area in Georgia. It is the southernmost county in Georgia. A large portion of the county lies within the Okefenokee Swamp and its federally protected areas.

The entire central and southern portion of Charlton County is located in the St. Marys sub-basin of the St. Marys-Satilla basin. The county's northeastern portion, north of Homeland, is located in the Satilla River sub-basin of the St. Marys-Satilla basin. The western portion of Charlton County is located in the Upper Suwannee River sub-basin of the larger Suwannee River basin. The country's southern region is level with the northernmost part of the central and eastern Panhandle of the Florida peninsula.

Major highways

  U.S. Route 1
  U.S. Route 23
  U.S. Route 301
  State Route 4
  State Route 15
  State Route 23
  State Route 40
  State Route 40 Connector
  State Route 94
  State Route 121
  State Route 177
  State Route 185
  State Route 252

Adjacent counties
 Brantley County - northeast
 Nassau County, Florida - east
 Camden County - east
 Baker County, Florida - south
 Ware County - northwest

National protected area
 Okefenokee National Wildlife Refuge (part)

Demographics

2000 census
As of the census of 2000, there were 10,282 people, 3,342 households, and 2,499 families living in the county.  The population density was 13 people per square mile (5/km2).  There were 3,859 housing units at an average density of 5 per square mile (2/km2).  The racial makeup of the county was 68.59% White, 29.26% Black or African American, 0.42% Native American, 0.34% Asian, 0.06% Pacific Islander, 0.14% from other races, and 1.21% from two or more races.  0.79% of the population were Hispanic or Latino of any race.

There were 3,342 households, out of which 37.60% had children under the age of 18 living with them, 55.40% were married couples living together, 15.00% had a female householder with no husband present, and 25.20% were non-families. 21.80% of all households were made up of individuals, and 8.50% had someone living alone who was 65 years of age or older.  The average household size was 2.74 and the average family size was 3.20.

In the county, the population was spread out, with 27.50% under the age of 18, 10.60% from 18 to 24, 31.70% from 25 to 44, 20.60% from 45 to 64, and 9.70% who were 65 years of age or older.  The median age was 33 years. For every 100 females there were 112.40 males.  For every 100 females age 18 and over, there were 115.60 males.

The median income for a household in the county was $27,869, and the median income for a family was $33,364. Males had a median income of $26,631 versus $17,978 for females. The per capita income for the county was $12,920.  About 17.80% of families and 20.90% of the population were below the poverty line, including 29.10% of those under age 18 and 20.40% of those age 65 or over.

2010 census
As of the 2010 United States Census, there were 12,171 people, 3,927 households, and 2,866 families living in the county. The racial makeup of the county was 68.6% white, 28.5% black or African American, 0.6% Asian, 0.4% American Indian, 0.3% from other races, and 1.6% from two or more races. Those of Hispanic or Latino origin made up 2.5% of the population. In terms of ancestry, 7.9% were American, 7.3% were English, and 6.2% were Irish.

Of the 3,927 households, 35.3% had children under the age of 18 living with them, 52.5% were married couples living together, 15.2% had a female householder with no husband present, 27.0% were non-families, and 23.1% of all households were made up of individuals. The average household size was 2.64 and the average family size was 3.10. The median age was 38.2 years.

The median income for a household in the county was $40,850 and the median income for a family was $45,913. Males had a median income of $36,675 versus $25,140 for females. The per capita income for the county was $16,652. About 18.1% of families and 19.8% of the population were below the poverty line, including 23.4% of those under age 18 and 12.8% of those age 65 or over.

2020 census

As of the 2020 United States census, there were 12,518 people, 3,675 households, and 2,685 families residing in the county.

Communities
 Folkston
 Homeland
 Moniac
 Racepond
 Saint George
 Toledo
 Trader's Hill
 Uptonville

Education

Politics

See also

 National Register of Historic Places listings in Charlton County, Georgia
List of counties in Georgia

References

External links

 Okefenokee National Wildlife Refuge U.S. Fish and Wildlife Service
 Charlton County historical marker
 Sardis Church historical marker

 
1854 establishments in Georgia (U.S. state)
Georgia (U.S. state) counties
Populated places established in 1854